Adewale Ojomo (born November 11, 1988) is a former American football defensive end. He signed with the New York Giants as an undrafted free agent. He played college football at the University of Miami.

Early years
Ojomo attended Hialeah High School in Florida. He was rated as the No. 72 player in the state by the Orlando Sentinel.

College career
He played college football at the University of Miami. Ojomo finished college with 79 tackles, 9.5 sacks, 3 pass deflections, 2 forced fumbles.

In his freshman season, Ojomo had 22 tackles, 3 sacks, a pass deflection and a forced fumble.

In his junior season, he had 38 tackles, 5 sacks and a pass deflection. On September 2, 2010, in the season opener against Florida A&M in which Ojomo recorded 3 tackles and 2 sacks helping the Miami Hurricanes win 45-0.

In his senior season, Ojomo had 19 tackles, 1.5 sacks, a pass deflection and a forced fumble.

Professional career

New York Giants
On May 1, 2012, Ojomo signed with the New York Giants as an Undrafted free agent.

Seattle Seahawks
He was signed to the Seahawks' practice squad on September 17, 2013.

Buffalo Bills
Ojomo was signed to the Bills' practice squad on September 24, 2013.

Tennessee Titans
On December 11, 2013, Ojomo signed with the Tennessee Titans practice squad. He was waived on April 7, 2014, two weeks after he was arrested for soliciting a prostitute in Miami.

Los Angeles KISS
Ojomo was assigned to the Los Angeles KISS of the Arena Football League on May 22, 2014.

Dallas Cowboys
Ojomo signed with the Dallas Cowboys on August 1, 2014. The Cowboys waived Ojomo on August 26, 2014.

Hamilton Tiger-Cats
Ojomo was signed by the Hamilton Tiger-Cats of the Canadian Football League on September 17, 2014 and was assigned to the team's practice roster.

References

External links
Miami Hurricanes bio
New York Giants bio
Hamilton Tiger-Cats bio

1988 births
Living people
People from Opa-locka, Florida
American football defensive ends
Miami Hurricanes football players
New York Giants players
Seattle Seahawks players
Buffalo Bills players
Tennessee Titans players
Los Angeles Kiss players
Dallas Cowboys players
Sportspeople from Miami-Dade County, Florida
Players of American football from Florida
Hamilton Tiger-Cats players
Hialeah Senior High School alumni